Modakurichi is a neighbourhood in Modakurichi, Tamil Nadu, India.

Modakurichi may also refer to:
 Modakurichi town
 Modakurichi block
 Modakurichi taluk 
 Modakkurichi (state assembly constituency)